Kristina Petrushevska (born 23 September 2000) is a Macedonian footballer who plays as a forward for the North Macedonia national team.

International career
Petrushevska made her debut for the North Macedonia national team on 17 September 2021, coming on as a substitute for Afrodita Salihi against England.

References

2000 births
Living people
Women's association football forwards
Macedonian women's footballers
North Macedonia women's international footballers